Len Bilous (born 11 June 1948) is a retired American soccer player and coach.  He played in the American Soccer League and coached for three seasons in the Major Indoor Soccer League where he was the 1979-1980 MISL Coach of the Year.

Born in Germany and raised in Venezuela, Bilous attended Temple University, where he played on the men's soccer team from 1967 to 1969.  He played for the Philadelphia Spartans in the American Soccer League.  In 1972, he joined the Delaware Wings.

In 1976, Bilous was hired to coach the NCAA Division I Quinnipiac University soccer team.  In 1978, he was named the head coach of the newly established Cincinnati Kids of the Major Indoor Soccer League.  He became the head coach of the Pittsburgh Spirit and turned the team around after they had started 5-10.  He was named the MISL Coach of the Year along with Pat McBride.  Although Bilous took the Spirit into the playoffs, the team faced financial difficulties and spent the 1980-1981 season on hiatus.  In September 1980, Bilous moved to the Philadelphia Fever though was let go with five games remaining in the 1980-1981 season.

Yearly Awards
MISL Coach of the Year
1979-80 (Jointly held with Pat McBride)

References

American soccer coaches
American soccer players
American Soccer League (1933–1983) players
Delaware Wings players
Major Indoor Soccer League (1978–1992) coaches
College men's soccer coaches in the United States
Philadelphia Spartans players
Temple Owls men's soccer players
Quinnipiac University people
Living people
Association footballers not categorized by position
1948 births